Rita the American Girl (Italian: Rita, la figlia americana) is a 1965 Italian "musicarello"  film  directed by Piero Vivarelli with Totò and Rita Pavone.

Plot
Professor Serafino Benvenuti is a master of classical music who has the passion of the orchestra director. However, the young audience of the 60 does not appreciate classical composers like Mozart or Beethoven, and so Serafino is likely to have compromised his image as a director. One day Serafino receives the news that his adopted daughter Rita is about to return to Italy from America, where she is studying. Serafino is very happy, because at least he can teach her the real music. However, Rita is deeply grown and changed: she follows the musical patterns of her time: the rock music and blues. Serafino gets very angry, especially when he discovers that his daughter falls in love with a young man, a member of a band called "The Rockets."

Cast
Totò	as	Serafino Benvenuti
Rita Pavone	as	Rita D'Angelo
Fabrizio Capucci	as 	Fabrizio Carli
Lina Volonghi	as 	Greta Wagner
Umberto D'Orsi	as	Orazio 
Veronica	as	Diana 
Shel Shapiro		(credited as David Norman Shapiro)
Mike Shepstone
Bobby Posner
Johnny Charlton

References

Bibliography
 Heide Fehrenbach & Uta G. Poiger. Transactions, Transgressions, Transformations: American Culture in Western Europe and Japan. Berghahn Books, 2000.

External links
 

1965 films
1960s Italian-language films
1965 musical comedy films
Musicarelli
Films directed by Piero Vivarelli
Films set in Rome
Films shot in Rome
Films with screenplays by Bruno Corbucci
1960s Italian films